João Morelli Neto (born 11 March 1996) is a Brazilian professional footballer who plays as a forward for Canadian Premier League club HFX Wanderers.

Early life
Morelli was born and raised in the city of Itu, São Paulo state. In 2013, he joined the under-17 team of local club Ituano, where he scored three goals in eight appearances, primarily as a substitute. The following year, he was promoted to the under-20 team, where he made another five appearances.

Club career

Middlesbrough
In March 2015, Morelli signed a contract with EFL Championship side Middlesbrough until the end of the season, the result of Boro's partnership with Ituano. In the 2016–17 season, he made ten appearances in Premier League 2 for Middlesbrough's under-23 side, scoring two goals. Over the course of his first two years at the club, he scored eleven goals in 41 appearances in all competitions for Middlesbrough's under-23s.

Loan to FCI Levadia
On 20 February 2017, Morelli signed a one-year contract extension with Middlesbrough before going on a year-long loan to Estonian Meistriliiga side FCI Levadia Tallinn. In 22 league appearances that season, he scored sixteen goals, tying for fifth in league scoring. Morelli also played 90 minutes in both legs of Levadia's Europa League first qualifying round series against Irish club Cork City.

Fleetwood Town
On 31 January 2018, Morelli signed an 18-month contract with EFL League One side Fleetwood Town. Shortly after he signed for the club, manager Uwe Rösler was sacked and replaced by Joey Barton, under whom Morelli later recounted feeling "lost" after a drastic change of tactics and position. He subsequently failed to make a competitive appearance for the Fishermen and was released at the end of the season.

Return to Ituano
On 29 August 2018, Morelli returned to Ituano, where he made nine appearances and scored two goals in the Copa Paulista.

Return to Levadia
On 27 December 2018, Morelli returned to FCI Levadia, signing a two-year contract. He made 29 league appearances that season, scoring eleven goals. He also appeared for Levadia in the Estonian Supercup and scored a goal in one appearance in the Estonian Cup. Later in the season, he played every minute of both legs in Levadia's extra-time loss to Icelandic club Stjarnan in Europa League qualifying.

HFX Wanderers
On 25 February 2020, Morelli signed with Canadian Premier League side HFX Wanderers. He made his debut for the Wanderers on August 15 against Pacific FC, and converted a penalty in an eventual 2–2 draw. After a very strong 2021 season, Morelli was the Golden Boot winner in the CPL, netting 14 goals in 21 games and was nominated for the CPL Player of the Year award on December 5, 2021. On December 12 the Wanderers announced Morelli had signed a contract extension through 2023. Two days later on December 14 at the CPL awards ceremony, Morelli was named the 2021 CPL Player of the Year.

During the Wanderers' second game of the 2022 season against Atlético Ottawa on April 16, Morelli suffered an ACL injury, ruling him out for the remainder of the season.

Career statistics

Honours
HFX Wanderers
 Canadian Premier League
Runners-up: 2020

References

External links 
 Inspired by Kaká, HFX newcomer João Morelli hopes to make a big impact in CPL 
 João Morelli fala de experiência no futebol da Estônia e brinca com costume pós-jogo no país: a sauna 
 'Lido com mais desafios nesta volta ao Levadia', diz João Morelli 
 Gramados artificiais, frio e toque de bola: João Morelli conta sobre como é jogar na Estônia

1996 births
Living people
Association football forwards
Brazilian footballers
People from Itu, São Paulo
Brazilian expatriate footballers
Expatriate footballers in England
Brazilian expatriate sportspeople in England
Expatriate footballers in Estonia
Brazilian expatriate sportspeople in Estonia
Expatriate soccer players in Canada
Brazilian expatriate sportspeople in Canada
Middlesbrough F.C. players
FCI Levadia Tallinn players
Fleetwood Town F.C. players
Ituano FC players
HFX Wanderers FC players
Canadian Premier League players
Meistriliiga players
Footballers from São Paulo (state)